Vienna Township is one of seventeen townships in Grundy County, Illinois, USA.  As of the 2010 census, its population was 687 and it contained 266 housing units.

Geography

Cities, towns, villages
 Verona

Unincorporated towns
 Wauponsee at 
(This list is based on USGS data and may include former settlements.)

Demographics

Political districts
 Illinois' 11th congressional district
 State House District 75
 State Senate District 38

References
 
 United States Census Bureau 2007 TIGER/Line Shapefiles
 United States National Atlas

External links
 City-Data.com
 Illinois State Archives

Townships in Grundy County, Illinois
Townships in Illinois
1849 establishments in Illinois